Linkup was a French boy band, created by the third season of the popular French reality show Popstars, called "Popstars - the Duel" aired on RTL Group TV channel M6 (also known as Métropole 6) in fall 2003. It consisted of Matthieu, Lionel et Otis. Matthieu (which full name is Matthieu Tota) became later known as singer M. Pokora.

Career
The band released their debut and only album Notre étoile (meaning Our star in French). The debut single from the album, "Mon étoile" (meaning My star in French) was a success, reaching #1 in the French charts.

The following single, Une seconde d'éternité (One second of eternity) and the album didn't find much success. After a collaboration with the English boy band Blue in recording the single "You & Me Bubblin", which also failed to attract enough sales, Linkup disbanded in 2004.

After break-up
Matthieu Tota, former charismatic leader of the band, started a solo career under the name Matt Pokora and after, M. Pokora.
In spring of 2005, Lionel Tim was one of the finalists to represent France in the Eurovision Song Contest but Ortal was chosen instead. In 2005-2006, Lionel released two singles "Je m'envole" followed by "Vivre avec toi" (French version of Taylor Hicks' Just to Feel That Way) with achieved moderate success.

Discography

Studio albums

Singles

References

French pop music groups
French boy bands
Popstars contestants
Popstars winners